Abdul Khaleq Alghanem (1958 – 18 May 2021) was a Saudi Arabian film director.

Career 
Alghanem started his directing career by directing film series Rehlat Alsaid in 1992. He was the director of most episodes of the well-known Saudi film series Tash ma Tash. In 2002, he appeared as an actor in the series Shwaya Melh, which he also directed.

Selected filmography 
 Tash ma Tash (1993–2011)
 Snab Shaf (2017)
 Shad Balad (2016)
 Anber 12 (2013)
 Win or lose (2012)
 min alaakhir (2012)
 Bullish bearish (2012)
 Magadif El Amal (2005)

Death 
On 18 May 2021, he died in King Fahad Specialist Hospital Dammam, after suffering from prostate cancer for the last five years of his life.

References 

1958 births
2021 deaths
Saudi Arabian film directors
People from Eastern Province, Saudi Arabia
Deaths from cancer in Saudi Arabia
Deaths from prostate cancer
Date of birth missing